Scarecrow is the eighth studio album by American country music artist Garth Brooks. It was released on November 13, 2001, and debuted at #1 on the Billboard 200 chart, and the Top Country Albums chart. It has been certified 5× platinum RIAA and was named Best Selling Album at the 2002 Canadian Country Music Association Awards.

The album was re-released in 2016 with two extra songs: "More Than a Memory" which was a number one country hit in 2007, and "Good Ride Cowboy" (2005), a tribute to singer–rodeo star Chris LeDoux.

Background
Brooks commented on the album saying:

Content
Singles released from this album include "Beer Run (B Double E Double Are You In?)" (a duet with George Jones, also found on Jones's 2001 album The Rock: Stone Cold Country 2001), "Wrapped Up in You", "Squeeze Me In" (a duet with Trisha Yearwood), "Thicker Than Blood", and "Why Ain't I Running". Of these, "Wrapped Up in You" was the highest peaking, reaching #5 on the Hot Country Songs charts. Prior to the album's release, "When You Come Back to Me Again" had charted on the country charts as a selection from the soundtrack to the film Frequency.

Several of the tracks on this album were originally recorded by other artists. "Pushing Up Daisies" was originally recorded by Kevin Welch on his 1995 album Life Down Here on Earth, while "Big Money" was originally recorded under the title "It Pays Big Money" by Mark Chesnutt on his 2000 album Lost in the Feeling. Additionally, "Don't Cross the River" was previously recorded by America on their 1972 album Homecoming. "Squeeze Me In" was previously recorded by Lee Roy Parnell on his 1995 album We All Get Lucky Sometimes.

Track listing

Original release

Personnel
Compiled from liner notes.

Musicians

 Sam Bacco - percussion on "Wrapped Up in You", "Thicker Than Blood", "Rodeo or Mexico", "Don't Cross the River" and "When You Come Back to Me Again"; drums on "Wrapped Up in You"; tambourine on "Squeeze Me In"
 Bruce Bouton - pedal steel guitar except "Wrapped Up in You" and "Don't Cross the River"; slide guitar on "Why Ain't I Running"
 Garth Brooks - lead vocals; backing vocals except "Beer Run (B-Double E-Double Are You In?)", "Big Money" and "Squeeze Me In"
 Dennis Burnside - string arrangements on "The Storm", "Mr. Midnight", and "When You Come Back to Me Again"
 Sam Bush - mandolin on "Don't Cross the River"
 Mark Casstevens - acoustic guitar except "Wrapped Up in You" and "Don't Cross the River"
 Mike Chapman - bass guitar except "Wrapped Up in You"
 Jerry Douglas - resonator guitar on "Don't Cross the River"
 Béla Fleck - banjo on "Don't Cross the River"
 Pat Flynn - acoustic guitar on "Don't Cross the River"
 Rob Hajacos - fiddle on "Beer Run (B-Double E-Double Are You In?)", "The Storm", "Big Money" and "Pushing Up Daisies"
 George Jones - duet vocals on "Beer Run (B-Double E-Double Are You In?)"
 Gordon Kennedy - acoustic guitar on "Wrapped Up in You"
 Wayne Kirkpatrick - acoustic guitar on "Wrapped Up in You"
 Chris Leuzinger - electric guitar except "Wrapped Up in You" and "Don't Cross the River"
 Jimmy Mattingly - fiddle on "Wrapped Up in You" and "Don't Cross the River"
 Terry McMillan - harmonica on "Wrapped Up in You"
 Joey Miskulin - accordion on "Beer Run (B-Double E-Double Are You In?)" and "Pushing Up Daisies"
 Milton Sledge - drums except "Wrapped Up in You"; percussion on "Rodeo or Mexico"
 Jimmie Lee Sloas - bass guitar on "Wrapped Up in You"
 Bobby Wood - keyboards except "Wrapped Up in You" and "Don't Cross the River"
 Trisha Yearwood - backing vocals (1, 4, 5, 9, 11, 12); duet vocals on "Squeeze Me In"

String section on "The Storm" and "Mr. Midnight": Carl Gorodetzky, Catherine Umstead, Pamela Sixfin, Gary Vanosdale, Lee Larrison, James Grosjean, Conni Ellisor, Kristin Wilkinson, Alan Umstaed, Elizabeth Stewart, David Davidson, Robert Mason, Mary Vanosdale, Carole Rabinowitz, David Angell, Jack Jezioro

String section on "When You Come Back to Me Again": Carl Gorodetzky, Cate Myer, Pamela Sixfin, Catherine UMstead, Lee Larrison, David Angell, Conni Ellisor, Kristin Wilkinson, Alan Umstead, Gary Vanosdale, David Davidson, Robert Mason, Karen Winkelmann, John Catchings

Recording personnel
Eric Conn - digital editing
Duke Duczer - recording assistant
Carlos Grier - digital editing
John Kelton - engineering
Mark Miller - recording and mixing engineer
Denny Purcell - mastering engineer
Allen Reynolds - producer
Keith Stegall - recording engineer

Charts
In the United States, Scarecrow debuted at No. 1 on the Billboard 200, becoming his eighth No. 1 album on the chart, and No. 1 on the Top Country Albums, becoming his eleventh No. 1 Country album. In January 2006, Scarecrow was certified 5× Platinum by the RIAA.

Weekly charts

Year-end charts

Certifications

References

External links

2001 albums
Garth Brooks albums
Capitol Records albums
Albums produced by Allen Reynolds
Canadian Country Music Association Top Selling Album albums